The Way of Ambition is a 1913 novel by the British writer Robert Hichens. An young woman marries a musical genius and ambitiously manages his career.

References

Bibliography
 Vinson, James. Twentieth-Century Romance and Gothic Writers. Macmillan, 1982.

1913 British novels
Novels by Robert Hichens